Calomyrmex is a genus of ants in the subfamily Formicinae. The genus is known from Indonesia, New Guinea and Australia. Calomyrmex has a mandibular gland that secrets red droplets on the sides of its head that have a strong and unpleasant odor when disturbed.

Species
Calomyrmex albertisi (Emery, 1887)
Calomyrmex albopilosus (Mayr, 1876)
Calomyrmex glauerti Clark, 1930
Calomyrmex impavidus (Forel, 1893)
Calomyrmex laevissimus (Smith, 1859)
Calomyrmex purpureus (Mayr, 1876)
Calomyrmex similis (Mayr, 1876)
Calomyrmex splendidus (Mayr, 1876)
Calomyrmex tropicus (Smith, 1861)

References

External links

Formicinae
Ant genera
Hymenoptera of Asia
Hymenoptera of Australia